"It Never Rains (In Southern California)" is a 1990 song recorded by the American R&B group Tony! Toni! Toné!. This song peaked at number one on the Billboard Hot R&B Singles chart in 1990 for two weeks, and thirty-four on the Hot 100.

Music video
The music video to "It Never Rains (In Southern California)" was directed by actress Lisa Bonet.

Chart performance

See also
List of number-one R&B singles of 1990 (U.S.)

References

External links
[ Song review] on Allmusic

1990 singles
Tony! Toni! Toné! songs
1990 songs
Songs written by Raphael Saadiq
Contemporary R&B ballads
1990s ballads